Euhadra sadoensis is a species of air-breathing land snail, a terrestrial pulmonate gastropod mollusk in the family Bradybaenidae. This species is found in Japan.

References

Euhadra
Gastropods described in 1903
Molluscs of Japan
Taxonomy articles created by Polbot